New Boston (or Union City) was a historical populated place in Juneau, Alaska.  It was located one mile west of the city of Juneau, on Douglas Island; according to R. N. DeArmond, it was a short-lived town.

References

Populated places in Juneau, Alaska